Eisbock milk (Chinese: 冰博克' Pinyin: bīngbókè), also known as freeze distilled milk is a condensed milk drink. It is produced using low temperature filtration technology that physically purifies milk by removing part of its water content, the idea which is inspired by eisbock, a type of strong beer from Germany.

History 
The process for hand-making fresh condensed milk was first attempted by Canadian barista Ben Put during the World Barista Championship in 2017. During the Chinese selection stage of the following year’s competition, barista Pang Hui attempted the same technique, eventually passing on the technique to fellow barista Pan Zhimin, who used it to compete in the world championship.

After the competition, hand-making condensed milk was used to prepare milk coffee at coffee shops around China. After discovering Eisbock milk in coffee and tea shops in 2018, a Chinese company named BeFood (Shanghai Biru Foods Co., Ltd.) developed ways to mass-produce this type of fresh condensed milk and started to call it Eisbock milk, also known as 冰博克 in Chinese. BeFood officially launched its Eisbock product line in 2019. Beverage companies Hey Tea and Lele Tea developed milk tea products using BeFood’s Eisbock milk, which they released in 2020.

Product details 
Eisbock milk is purified twice so the milk contains less water content and a higher concentration of milk protein and calcium. Since the freezing point of milk is higher than water, the milk is frozen to separate nutrients from water. Because part of the water content is removed, the milk’s protein and lactose content increases after it thaws. Eisbock’s milk protein content can be as high as 6.2/100 ml with a calcium content as high as 210 mg/100 ml.

Eisbock milk is a common ingredient in “Dirty Coffee,” a coffee drink that consists of espresso layered with Eisbock milk.

See also 

 Baked milk
 Condensed milk
 Powdered milk
 Scalded milk

References 

Milk-based drinks